Diamond Skulls (also known as Dark Obsession) is a British 1989 thriller directed by Nick Broomfield who also co-wrote with Tim Rose-Price. An established documentary filmmaker, this is Broomfield's first work of fiction. It is produced by Tim Bevan and Jane Fraser and stars Amanda Donohoe, Gabriel Byrne, Ralph Brown, Judy Parfitt and Struan Rodger and has a music score by Hans Zimmer. It includes the last film performance of Ian Carmichael.

Plot 
Lord Hugo Bruckton is a young Englishman who is the heir to a vast fortune. He is married to Ginny, who seems devoted and loyal to him, and they have a young son. But Hugo is haunted by jealousy, for he imagines Ginny in the arms of a colleague. He begins to spy on her and goes into a rage over her suspected infidelity. One night, after a social gathering with members of his old British Army regiment, Hugo and his friends go out for a drive. He accidentally runs over a woman, who dies at the scene. All but one of his friends urge Hugo to drive on. In his drunk state of mind, Hugo had imagined himself running over Ginny.

Over the next few days, a psychological war ensues. Peter, Hugo's business associate, wants to use the cover-up to leverage power over the estate. Jamie, who's dating Hugo's sister, wants to go to the police to report it. Hugo's family closes ranks as Ginny and the rest side with Hugo, who fears that his arrest and imprisonment will ruin the family's reputation. As the police investigation closes in on Hugo, the power struggle leads to deadly consequences.

At the end, Peter and Hugo murder Jamie and arrange it to look like a suicide—that it had been Jamie driving the car that killed the woman—and he had killed himself out of guilt by throwing his dead body off a seaside cliff. The police believe the story and close the case, and the amoral Hugo gets away with everything as he continues his sordid and unwholesome life undisturbed.

Cast 

Amanda Donohoe as Ginny Bruckton
Gabriel Byrne as Lord Hugo Bruckton
Struan Rodger as Peter Eggleton
Douglas Hodge as Jamie Skinner
Ralph Brown as Jack
Peter Sands as Colonel
David Delve as Alec
Alexander Clempson as Edward
Catherine Livesey as Nanny
Michael Hordern as Lord Crewne
Ian Carmichael as Exeter

Matthew Marsh as Raul
Judy Parfitt as Lady Crewne
Sadie Frost as Rebecca
Edward Burnham as John the Gardener
Phyllida Hewat as Lady Castlemere
Patrick Field as Detective 1
Jay Benedict as Joe
Eiji Kusuhara as Ewo Nagasaky
Robin Summers as Detective 2
William Hoyland as Inspector Orchard

Production
In this movie Amanda Donohoe was faced with the added pressure of simulate sexual intercourse with another actor in front of director Nick Broomfield, with whom she was developing a romantic relationship. "I left the filming of that scene until the end of shooting," said Broomfield in reference to the controversial sex scene between Donohoe and Gabriel Byrne.

Rating 
Diamond Skulls received an NC-17 rating upon its release in the United States during June 1991.

Reception 
The film was given two thumbs up by Siskel & Ebert.

In the New York Times review Diamond Skulls; Aristocracy When It Thinks No One is Looking, Janet Maslin considered that "rarely does a documentary film maker make the transition to fiction as adroitly as Nicholas Broomfield has in Dark Obsession, a psychological thriller displaying a documentarian's fascination for small, telling details." Maslin also praised "an eerie score by Hans Zimmer, a chilling performance by Struan Rodger as Sir Hugo's cold blooded business associate and the unremarked upon inclusion of many odd bits of traditionalism that have presumably made men like Sir Hugo what they are".

References

External links 

1989 films
1980s thriller drama films
Films scored by Hans Zimmer
British thriller drama films
1989 crime drama films
1980s English-language films
1980s British films